The Foreleg of ox (a foreleg with the thigh) hieroglyph of ancient Egypt is an old hieroglyph; it even represented a nighttime constellation (the Big Dipper, Maskheti). It came to have many uses in ancient Egypt over three millennia.

Iconographic usage

Offered as "thigh-forward", "meat"
One of the major iconographic uses in ancient Egypt of the ox-foreleg was as part of the food offering to the individual being honored (the deceased), and engraved upon their steles. Often, besides lying on the top of the pile of food offerings, it is shown being presented to the honored individual, thigh first.

Offered as "hoof-forward", "strength"
Iconographically used as the symbolism of strength, power, dominion.

List of uses
A list of uses for the foreleg hieroglyph, with no order of importance actually implied:

Foreleg of ox, a "choice cut of meat"
Mortuary offering for ritual; the first item shown in the formulaic listing of items given to the deceased on the funerary stele (thigh, then fowl, bread, wine, beer, and linen, etc.)
In ritual ceremony, the right foreleg (of the ox) is always "unfettered" while incapacitating the ox, and is the sacrificed/ceremonial foreleg
Ideogram, or determinative–"thigh", "arm" 'khepesh' , (h)pš)
The "strong (human) arm", the strength implied by royal or divine gift
for "strength" (khepesh) in dedication ceremonies such as the Opening of the Mouth; also before mummy interment
the foreleg-thigh shape is equivalent to the power implied from the similar-shaped scimitar presented by a god
"The Foreleg" as the Big Dipper; equivalent in the Epic of Gilgamesh of the Mesopotamian civilizations, to the Bull of Heaven

Rosetta Stone
Though the Foreleg of ox hieroglyph is not used in the Rosetta Stone directly, the strength (khepesh) of the scimitar is. In line R-6: "... and a statue of the god of the city, giving to him [pharaoh Ptolemy V] a 'sword royal' (khepesh nesu) of victory"; the word khepesh uses the scimitar hieroglyph as the determinative. The quote is part of the ten rewards to be given to Pharaoh Ptolemy V in the Rosetta Stone.

See also
Gardiner's Sign List#F. Parts of Mammals
List of Egyptian hieroglyphs
Shoulder, cheeks and maw in Deuteronomy

References

Budge.  An Egyptian Hieroglyphic Dictionary, E.A.Wallace Budge, (Dover Publications), c 1978, (c 1920), Dover edition, 1978. (In two volumes) (softcover)
Budge.  The Rosetta Stone, E.A.Wallace Budge, (Dover Publications), c 1929, Dover edition(unabridged), 1989. (softcover)

Egyptian hieroglyphs: parts of mammals